The Kingdom of Galicia and Lodomeria was subdivided into a number of counties for administrative purposes. In 1877 there were 73 administrative counties and in 1900 there were 78 counties. The administrative counties were responsible for storing vital records. The Kingdom of Galicia and Lodomeria was the largest and most populous crownland of Cisleithenia between 1772 and 1918. More widely, the central European region of Galicia is today split between the modern states of Poland and Ukraine. Despite having passed through several intermediate states during the great wars of the 20th century, the regions have mainly preserved their territorial integrity and continue to demarcate the jurisdiction of local government authorities in their successor states.

Administrative counties in present-day Poland
In Poland today, there are parts of three provinces (voivodeships) that collectively formed the western part of the Kingdom of Galicia and Lodomeria. 

Only Subcarpathia  (Podkarpackie Voivodeship) was entirely contained in the Kingdom. The majority of the territory of Lesser Poland Voivodeship was contained in the Kingdom. From 1795 to 1815, three counties (powiats) that are situated north of the River Vistula were briefly part of the Kingdom: Olkusz County, Miechów County and Proszowice County. By the terms of the treaties of the Congress of Vienna they were annexed to Russian Poland ("Congress Poland") where they remained until the end of World War I. Additionally, the northernmost part of the land-county of Kraków around the villages of Sułoszowa, Skała and Słomniki were similarly allocated to Congress Russia; the remaining parts of the county were located in the Kingdom. The third voivodeship of Silesia contained only a small part of the Kingdom. The Silesian city-county of Jaworzno was originally part of the Kingdom's Chrzanowski county. The majority of the territory of the latter county is still an extant county in modern Poland – Chrzanów County – which is today located in the Lesser Poland voivodeship. The south-eastern Silesian land-counties of Żywiec County and Bielsko County along with the city-county of Bielsko-Biała formed the most westerly part of the Kingdom. The remaining 32 counties of Silesia were never part of the Kingdom.

Administrative raions in present-day Ukraine

In Ukraine today, there are three provinces (oblasts) that formed the eastern part of the Kingdom of Galicia. Two of these, Lviv Oblast and Ivano-Frankivsk Oblast were entirely contained in the kingdom; the third oblast of Ternopil was mainly in the kingdom apart from four of its most northerly counties (raions). These four counties, Kremenets Raion, Shumsk Raion, Lanivtsi as well as the northern half of Zbarazh Raion, were formerly part of the county of Krzemieniec in the Wolyn voivodeship (province) of the Second Polish Republic during the interwar period. Prior to World War I, they were part of Congress Poland. They never formed part of the Kingdom of Galicia. The remaining counties of Ternopil Oblast were all part of the Kingdom of Galicia and Lodomeria.

Carpathian Ruthenia, today largely contained in the Ukrainian oblast of Zakarpattia, was never part of the Kingdom of Galicia and Lodomeria nor of modern Poland. Instead, it was part of transleithanian lands of the Kingdom of Hungary.

Jewish Administrative Centers
The government assigned some towns the status of Jewish Administrative Center.  These Administrative Centers were responsible for maintaining Jewish vital records.

See also
 Subdivisions of Ukraine
 Voivodeships of Poland

References

Further reading 
 1877 Galician Administrative Districts from JewishGen
 1900 Galicia: Administrative Districts from PolishRoots
 74 Administrative Districts in Galicia
 Galician Administrative Districts from The Polish Genealogical Society of America

Galicia
Galicia
Bukovina
Galicia